American Communist History is a quarterly peer-reviewed academic journal published by Routledge on behalf of the Historians of American Communism. It covers research on the historical impact of Communism in the United States. The journal was established in 2002 and its founders were primarily founding editor-in-chief Daniel J. Leab (until 2006; also editor of Labor History), and John Earl Haynes. The journal's editorial board is balanced between revisionists and traditionalists and includes some foreign scholars. The current editor is Denise Lynn (University of Southern Indiana).

Abstracting and indexing
The journal is abstracted and indexed in:
EBSCO databases
International Bibliography of the Social Sciences
ProQuest databases
Scopus

See also
Twentieth Century Communism
Communisme

References

External links

History of the United States journals
Quarterly journals
English-language journals
Routledge academic journals
Publications established in 2002